Haft Asiab (also Romanized as Haft Āsīāb and Haft Āsyāb) is a village in Efzar Rural District, Efzar District, Qir and Karzin County, Fars Province, Iran. At the 2006 census, its population was 151, in 33 families.

References 

Populated places in Qir and Karzin County